List of Survivors episodes may refer to:

 List of Survivors (1975 TV series) episodes
 List of Survivors (2008 TV series) episodes